This list consists of notable animal characters that can walk, talk, act and sometimes look like humans, but also possess traits that allow them to be referred to as superheroes. These characters are usually changed from a non-human animal into human form or came from another planet to Earth. Some of the characters live on Earth, but its population comprises other anthropomorphic animals as well.

Many of these characters were originally seen in cartoons and comics such as Mighty Mouse and Underdog.  Today, talking animals can also be found in central roles in video games. Other anthropomorphic superheroes include:

A
 Abu from Aladdin
 Ace the Bat-Hound from Krypto the Superdog
 Adolescent Genetically Altered Karate Cows from The Fairly OddParents
 Adolescent Radioactive Black Belt Hamsters
 Aslan
 Amaterasu
 American Rabbit
 Antauri from Super Robot Monkey Team Hyperforce Go!
 Anubis Cruger from Power Rangers SPD
 Ape from Angel and the Ape
 Astro and the Space Mutts
 Atom Ant
 Atomic Mouse
 Avenger Penguins

B
 Baby Wildebeest
 Banjo
 Bat-Bat (parody of Batman) from Mighty Mouse: The New Adventures
 Bat-Duck (Plucky Duck's alter-ego) from Tiny Toon Adventures
 Batfink
 Battle Beasts
 Battle Cat
 Beasts of Burden
 Beppo, the Super-Monkey
 Biker Mice from Mars
 Blinx from Blinx: The Time Sweeper
 Bolt
 Bionic Bunny
 Biomutant
 Bucky O'Hare
 Buster the Amazing Bear

C
 Captain Carrot and His Amazing Zoo Crew
 Captain Goodvibes
 Captain Simian & the Space Monkeys
 C.H.O.M.P.S.
 Cheetahmen
 Chibiterasu
 Chiro from Super Robot Monkey Team Hyperforce Go!
 ChuChu from Kirby's Animal Friends
 Commander Anubis "Doggie" Cruger
 Comet the Super-Horse
 Coo from Kirby's Animal Friends
 Cosmo the Spacedog
 Courageous Cat and Minute Mouse
 Crash Bandicoot
 Croc
 Crusader Rabbit
 Cutey Bunny

D
 Danger Mouse
 Danger Rangers
 DarkMaus
 Darkwing Duck
 Decoy, the Pig Hostage (Hamton J. Pig's alter-ego and Bat-Duck's sidekick) from Tiny Toon Adventures
 Detective Chimp
 Devil Dinosaur
 Dinkan
 Dinosaucers
 Dinozaurs
 Dog Man
 The Dog Star Patrol from Krypto the Superdog
 Donkey Kong (character)
 Donatello from Teenage Mutant Ninja Turtles
 Droop-a-Long from Ricochet Rabbit & Droop-a-Long
 Duck Dodgers
 Dudley Puppy from T.U.F.F. Puppy
 Dukey Dog from Johnny Test
 Dynomutt

E
 Earthworm Jim
 El Kabong
 Erma Felna (the main character) from Albedo
 Eto Ranger
 Extreme Dinosaurs

F
 Fearless Fly
 Felicity from Rainbow Butterfly Unicorn Kitty
 Fili-Second from Power Ponies
 Fission Chicken
 Fox McCloud and most other characters in the Star Fox series

G
 Gex
 Gibson from Super Robot Monkey Team Hyperforce Go!
 GizmoDuck from DuckTales and made occasional appearances in Darkwing Duck
 Gleek (pet monkey) from Wonder Twins
 Gordon Quid from Catscratch
 The G.S.A from Missile Mouse

H
 Heronymous 'Hip' Flask
 Hit-Monkey
 Hong Kong Phooey
 Hoppy the Marvel Bunny
 Howard the Duck
 Hugin and Munin

I
 Iago from Aladdin
 Igor from Marvel Comics
 IM Weasel from I Am Weasel
 Immature Radioactive Samurai Slugs from Tiny Toon Adventures

J
 Jake the Dog
 Jazz Jackrabbit
 Jeff the Land Shark
 Junkyard
 Just'a Lotta Animals

K
 Kao the Kangaroo
 Karate Kat
 Katilda from Catscratch
 Kazooie
 Kay from The Legend of Kay
 Kine from Kirby's Animal Friends
 King Kazma from Summer Wars
 Kitty Katswell (Dudley Puppy's sidekick) from T.U.F.F. Puppy
 Kongo from Monkey Magic
 Krypto
 Kung Fu Dino Posse

L
 Lancelot Link
 Legion of Super-Pets
 Leena from Max Adventures
 Leonardo from Teenage Mutant Ninja Turtles
 Ling-Ling, the Secret Agent Battle Monster from Drawn Together
 Linny the Guinea Pig from Wonder Pets!
 Lockheed
 Lockjaw
 Lockjaw and the Pet Avengers
 The Loonatics - Ace Bunny, Danger Duck, Lexi Bunny, Rev Runner, Slam Tasmanian and Tech E. Coyote - from Loonatics Unleashed

M
 Mandarin from Super Robot Monkey Team Hyperforce Go!
 Mao Mao and related characters from Mao Mao: Heroes of Pure Heart
 Marion from Bounty Hamster
 Marvel Apes
 The Masked Matter-Horn from Power Ponies
 Maui Mallard
 Max from Max Adventures
 Michelangelo from Teenage Mutant Ninja Turtles
 The Mighty Ducks
 Mighty Mouse
 Ming-Ming the Duckling from Wonder Pets!
 Missile Mouse
 Miyamoto Usagi
 Monkey from Dial M for Monkey
 Monkey Joe
 Morcigo Verde
 Mothra

N
 Nago from Kirby's Animal Friends
 The Ninja Rabbit
 Nova from Super Robot Monkey Team Hyperforce Go!

O
 Old Lace
 Otto from Super Robot Monkey Team Hyperforce Go!

P
 Pantha
 Pandamonium
 Paperinik
 Perry the Platypus from Phineas and Ferb
 Pimple from Battletoads
 Pitch from Kirby's Animal Friends
 Pith Possum, Super Dynamic Possum of Tomorrow from The Shnookums and Meat Funny Cartoon Show
 Po from Kung Fu Panda
 Power Pig from U.S. Acres
 Pre-Teen Dirty-Gene Kung Fu Kangaroos
 Psycho Fox

R
 Radiance from Power Ponies
 Raphael from Teenage Mutant Ninja Turtles
 Rash from Battletoads
 Redwing
 Rex the Wonder Dog
 Road Rovers
 Rick from Kirby's Animal Friends
 Ricky Ricotta's Mighty Robot
 Ricochet Rabbit from Ricochet Rabbit & Droop-a-Long
 Rocket Raccoon (comics)
 Rocket (Marvel Cinematic Universe)
 Rufus

S
 Saddle Rager from Power Ponies
 Samurai Cat
 Samurai Pizza Cats
 Scaler
 The Scarlet Pumpernickel (Daffy Duck's alter ego in a 1950 short)
 Sebastian Star Bear
 Secret Squirrel
 Sharky and George
 Shiina from Oumagadoki Zoo
 Skylanders
 Skunk from Skunk Fu!
 Sly Cooper and related characters from the Sly Cooper series
 Snailiens
 Solovar
 Sonic the Hedgehog and most other characters in the Sonic the Hedgehog series
 Space Beaver
 Space Canine Patrol Agents
 Space Cats
 Space Mouse
 Space Wolf
 Sparkster
 Spider-Ham (as well as the assorted Marvel superhero parodies that inhabit the Spider-Ham universe)
 Splinter
 Sprx-77 from Super Robot Monkey Team Hyperforce Go!
 Spyro the Dragon as well as most characters throughout the franchise
 StarDog and TurboCat
 Streaky the Supercat
 Street Sharks
 Splendid from Happy Tree Friends
 Stupor Duck (Daffy Duck's alter-ego) from a 1956 short
 Superbunny
 Super Chicken
 Supercow (Cow's alter-ego) from Cow and Chicken
 Super Goof
 Super Rabbit (Bugs Bunny's alter-ego) from a 1943 short
 Super Rabbit (Timely Comics)
 SuperTed
 Super-Turtle
 Super Squirrel
 SWAT Kats
 Sweet Valerian

T
 T-Rex
 Teenage Mutant Ninja Turtles
 Throg
 ThunderCats
 Thunder Bunny
 TigerSharks
 Tippy-Toe
 Toki (a friend and confidant to Erma Felna) from Albedo 
 Tonde Burin
 Topo
 Top Dog
 Touché Turtle
 Toxic Revenger (Plucky Duck's alter-ego) from Tiny Toon Adventures
 Tuck the Turtle from Wonder Pets!
 Turner from Lugaru
 Ty the Tasmanian Tiger

U
 Ulysses from Flora & Ulysses
 Underdog
 Usagi from Albedo

V
 Venus from Teenage Mutant Ninja Turtles
 Virgil from Mighty Max (TV series)

W
 Waffle Ryebread from Tail Concerto
 Wild West C.O.W.-Boys of Moo Mesa
 We3
 Wonder Dog
 Wonder Dog from the video game of the same name
 Wonder Wart-Hog
 Wonder Wattle (Chicken's alter ego) from Cow and Chicken

Y
 Yin Yang Yo!
 Yoshi
 Yukk! (partnered with Mighty Man)

Z
 Zabu
 Zapp from Power Ponies
 Zits from Battletoads

References

Anthropomorphic animal superheroes|Anthropomorphic
 
 Superheroes
Superheroes
Superhero